Steven C. Harris is an American politician who served as a member of the Idaho House of Representatives for the 21A district from 2012 to 2022.

Early life and education
Harris was born in Salt Lake City, Utah. He earned a Master of Science in technology management from Brigham Young University.

Elections

References

External links
Steven Harris at the Idaho Legislature

Year of birth missing (living people)
Living people
Brigham Young University alumni
Republican Party members of the Idaho House of Representatives
People from Meridian, Idaho
Politicians from Salt Lake City
21st-century American politicians